Sunflower County is a county located in the U.S. state of Mississippi. As of the 2020 census, the population was 25,971. Its largest city and county seat is Indianola.

Sunflower County comprises the Indianola, MS Micropolitan Statistical Area, which is included in the Cleveland-Indianola, MS Combined Statistical Area. It is located in the Mississippi Delta region.

Mississippi State Penitentiary (Parchman Farm) is located in Sunflower County.

History
Sunflower County was created in 1844. The land mass encompassed most of Sunflower and Leflore Counties as we know them today. The first seat of government was Clayton, located near Fort Pemberton. Later the county seat was moved to McNutt, also in the Leflore County of today. When Sunflower and Leflore Counties were separated in 1871, the new county seat for Sunflower County was moved to Johnsonville. This village was located where the north end of Mound Bayou empties into the Sunflower River. In 1882 the county seat was moved to Eureka, which was later renamed Indianola.

The Boyer Cemetery, located in Boyer, goes back to the early days of Sunflower County.

After the U.S. Civil War, across several decades African Americans migrated to Sunflower County to work in the Mississippi Delta. In 1870, 3,243 black people lived in Sunflower County. This increased to 12,070 in 1900, making up 75% of the residents in Sunflower County. Between 1900 and 1920, the black population almost tripled.

Geography
Sunflower County is the longest county in Mississippi. The traveling distance from the southern boundary at Caile to its northern boundary at Rome is approximately 71 miles.

Adjacent counties
 Coahoma County (north)
 Tallahatchie County (northeast)
 Leflore County (east)
 Humphreys County (south)
 Washington County (southwest)
 Bolivar County (northwest)

Demographics

The county reached its peak population in 1930. After that, population declined from 1940 to 1990. There was considerable migration out of the rural county, especially as mechanization reduced the need for farm labor. Both whites and blacks left the county. Many African Americans migrated north or west to industrial cities to escape the social oppression and violence of Jim Crow, especially moving in the Great Migration during and after World War II, when the defense industry on the West Coast attracted many.

2020 census

As of the 2020 United States Census, there were 25,971 people, 8,322 households, and 5,292 families residing in the county.

2010 census
As of the 2010 United States Census, there were 29,450 people living in the county. 72.9% were black or African American, 25.4% white, 0.3% Asian, 0.2% Native American, 0.6% of some other race and 0.5% of two or more races. 1.4% were Hispanic or Latino (of any race).

2000 census
As of the census of 2000, there were 34,369 people, 9,637 households, and 7,314 families living in the county. The population density was 50 people per square mile (19/km2). There were 10,338 housing units at an average density of 15 per square mile (6/km2).  The racial makeup of the county was 69.86% Black or African American, 28.88% White, 0.09% Native American, 0.40% Asian, 0.48% from other races, and 0.28% from two or more races. 1.30% of the population were Hispanic or Latino of any race.

1990 census
As of the census of 1990, there were 32,341 people. The racial makeup of the county was 71.89% Black or African American, 26.40% White or European American, 0.12% Native American, 0.60% Asian, 0.50% from other races, and 0.28% from two or more races. 1.31% of the population were Hispanic or Latino of any race.

1980 census
As of the census of 1980, there were 30,402 people. The racial makeup of the county was 73.88% Black or African American, 24.45% White or European American,  0.15% Native American, 0.80% Asian, 0.52% from other races, and 0.28% from two or more races.  1.32% of the population were Hispanic or Latino of any race.

As of the census of 2000, there were 9,637 households, out of which 38.40% had children under the age of 18 living with them, 42.30% were married couples living together, 28.40% had a female householder with no husband present, and 24.10% were non-families. 21.20% of all households were made up of individuals, and 9.70% had someone living alone who was 65 years of age or older. The average household size was 3.01 and the average family size was 3.50.

In the county, the population was spread out, with 27.90% under the age of 18, 14.00% from 18 to 24, 30.30% from 25 to 44, 18.10% from 45 to 64, and 9.70% who were 65 years of age or older. The median age was 30 years. For every 100 females there were 115.90 males. For every 100 females age 18 and over, there were 120.00 males.

The median income for a household in the county was $24,970, and the median income for a family was $29,144. Males had a median income of $26,208 versus $19,145 for females. The per capita income for the county was $11,365. About 24.60% of families and 30.00% of the population were below the poverty line, including 39.50% of those under age 18 and 24.10% of those age 65 or over.

Sunflower County has the ninth-lowest per capita income in Mississippi and the 72nd-lowest in the United States.

Government

The Mississippi Department of Corrections (MDOC) is responsible for the state's correctional services, probation services, and parole services. MDOC operates the Mississippi State Penitentiary (MSP; colloquially known as 'Parchman Farm') in the unincorporated community of Parchman in Sunflower County and a probation and parole office in the Courthouse Annex in Indianola.

MSP, a prison for men, is the location of the State of Mississippi male death row and the State of Mississippi execution chamber. Around the time of MSP's opening in 1901, Sunflower County residents objected to having executions performed at MSP because they feared that Sunflower County would be stigmatized as a "death county." Therefore, the State of Mississippi originally performed executions of condemned criminals in their counties of conviction. By the 1950s residents of Sunflower County were still opposed to the concept of housing the execution chamber at MSP. In September 1954, Governor Hugh White called for a special session of the Mississippi Legislature to discuss the application of the death penalty. During that year, an execution chamber was installed at MSP.

Economy
In December 2011, Sunflower County's unemployment rate was 16.2%. The Mississippi statewide rate was 9.9%, and the U.S. overall unemployment rate was 8.3%.

 it was one of the poorest counties in the state, and one of the poorest in the United States.

Transportation

Major highways
  U.S. Highway 49W
  U.S. Highway 82
  Mississippi Highway 3
  Mississippi Highway 8
  Mississippi Highway 32

Airports
Two airports are located in unincorporated Sunflower County. Indianola Municipal Airport, near Indianola, is operated by the city. Ruleville-Drew Airport, between Drew and Ruleville, is jointly operated by the two cities.

Education

Colleges and universities
Mississippi Delta Community College has a main campus in Moorhead and other locations.

Primary and secondary schools

Public schools
 Public School Districts
 Sunflower County Consolidated School District - The district is the only school district in Sunflower County.
 Former districts: Drew School District, Indianola School District, Sunflower County School District
Between 2010 and 2012, the State of Mississippi had taken over all three Sunflower County school districts and put them under the conservatorship of the Mississippi Department of Education, due to academic and financial reasons.

In February 2012 the Mississippi Senate voted 43–4 to pass Senate Bill 2330, to consolidate the three school districts into one school district. The bill went to the Mississippi House of Representatives.

The Greenwood Commonwealth said that the county was an "easy target" for school merging due to the difficulties in all three school districts, and that the scenario "doesn’t leave them with much leverage to argue in favor of the status quo. And because none of them does well, none of them can object to assuming someone else's headaches. All three are beset with them." Later that month, the State Board of Education approved the consolidation of the Drew School District and the Sunflower County School District, and if Senate Bill 2330 is approved, Indianola School District will be added.

In May 2012 Governor of Mississippi Phil Bryant signed the bill into law, requiring all three districts to consolidate. SB2330 stipulates that if a county has three school districts all under conservatorship by the Mississippi Department of Education will have them consolidated into one school district serving the entire county. As of July 1, 2012, the Drew School District was consolidated with the Sunflower County School District.

Private schools

 Private School
 Indianola Academy (Indianola)
 North Sunflower Academy (Unincorporated area)
Restoration Ministries Christian Academy

The Central Delta Academy in Inverness closed on May 21, 2010.

All three of the private schools originated as segregation academies.

Pillow Academy in unincorporated Leflore County, near Greenwood, enrolls some students from Sunflower County. It originally was a segregation academy.

Public libraries
The Sunflower County Library provides library services. The administration is in Indianola, and the system operates libraries in Drew, Indianola, Inverness, Moorhead, and Ruleville.

Media
The Enterprise-Tocsin, a newspaper based out of Indianola, is distributed throughout Sunflower County. The Bolivar Commercial is also distributed in Sunflower County.

Communities
J. Todd Moye, author of Let the People Decide: Black Freedom and White Resistance Movements in Sunflower County, Mississippi, 1945-1986, said "Sunflower County has always been overwhelmingly rural." At the end of the 20th century, the county had just four "main towns of any size."

Cities
 Indianola (county seat)
 Drew
 Moorhead
 Ruleville
 Shaw (mostly in Bolivar County)

Towns
 Doddsville
 Inverness
 Sunflower

Unincorporated communities

 Baird
 Baltzer
 Blaine
 Boyer
 Caile
 Dockery
 Dwyer
 Fairview
 Heathman
 Holly Ridge
 Kinlock
 Linn
 Lombardy
 Minot
 Mississippi State Penitentiary (Parchman)
 Rome
 Roundaway
 Steiner
 Stephenville

Ghost towns
 Cottondale
 Inwood
 Promised Land

Notable people
 Jerry Butler (Soul singer, inductee Rock and Roll Hall of Fame, born 1939)
 Willie Best (actor, 1916–1962)
 Craig Claiborne  (Food Editor, New York Times, 1920–2000)
 James Eastland (U.S. Senator from Mississippi, 1904–1986)
 C. L. Franklin, father of Aretha Franklin (minister, civil rights activist, 1915–1984)
 Fannie Lou Hamer (Civil Rights Activist, Philanthropist, 1917–1977)
 B.B. King (bluesman, 1925–2015)
 Sam Lacey (retired NBA basketball player, 1948–present)
 Archie Manning (NFL quarterback, 1971–1984); father of Peyton Manning, Cooper Manning and Eli Manning
 Charlie Patton (bluesman, 1891–1934)
 Johnny Russell, country singer

See also

 Mississippi Delta
 National Register of Historic Places listings in Sunflower County, Mississippi

References
Specific

General
 Excerpt of: Mills, Kay This Little Light of Mine. In: Barnwell, Marion (editor) A Place Called Mississippi: Collected Narratives. University Press of Mississippi, 1997. , 9781617033391.

External links
 Sunflower County - State of Mississippi
 Sunflower County Library

 
Mississippi counties
1844 establishments in Mississippi
Populated places established in 1844
Black Belt (U.S. region)
Majority-minority counties in Mississippi